"Unsainted" is a song by American  heavy metal band Slipknot. It was released as the lead single from their sixth studio album We Are Not Your Kind on May 16, 2019, accompanied by its music video. This is the first Slipknot single released since "All Out Life", which was released on October 31, 2018, as well as their first single without their former percussionist Chris Fehn who was fired from the band due to a lawsuit earlier in 2019.

Critical reception
Jon Blistein of Rolling Stone called the song an "unsparing headbanger", saying it "opens with an expertly crafted build, as choir vocals—performed by the Angel City Chorale—float above rumbling drums, tidal wave guitars and frontman Corey Taylor's vocals" before becoming the "double bass drum hits and jagged guitars that carry the rest of the song". Revolver called it a "much more accessible, radio-friendly cut" than the band's non-album single "All Out Life", although felt that this "doesn't mean that its lyrics pull any punches", judging it to be "explosive".

Track listing

Music video
A music video directed by Shawn "Clown" Crahan was released alongside the song on May 16 2019. Blistein characterized the video as full of "creepy, cultish imagery". It ends with Corey Taylor walking out of a church to find he and the other members of the band turned into statues, then proceeding to light his statue on fire. Luke Morton of Kerrang! called the video "a lot to take in", writing that it is "full of kaleidoscopic visuals, religious iconography, [and] fire".

As of December 2022, the music video for "Unsainted" has over 130 million views on YouTube.

In other media
 In 2019, "Unsainted" was selected as the official theme song for WWE's NXT TakeOver: Toronto PPV.

 In 2019, "Unsainted" was selected as DLC for Rock Band 4

Charts

Weekly charts

Year-end charts

Certifications

References

2019 singles
2019 songs
Slipknot (band) songs
Roadrunner Records singles
Songs written by Corey Taylor
Songs written by Jim Root
Songs written by Shawn Crahan